is a passenger railway station in the city of Jōsō, Ibaraki Prefecture, Japan operated by the private railway company Kantō Railway.

Lines

Station layout
The station has two opposed side platforms, connected to the station building by both a level crossing and a footbridge.

Platforms

Adjacent stations

History
Ishige Station was opened on 1 November 1913 as a station on the Jōsō Railroad, which became the Kantō Railway in 1965.

Passenger statistics
In fiscal 2017, the station was used by an average of 854 passengers daily).

Surrounding area
former Ishige Town Hall
 Ishige Post Office

See also
 List of railway stations in Japan

References

External links

 Kantō Railway Station Information 

Railway stations in Ibaraki Prefecture
Railway stations in Japan opened in 1913
Jōsō, Ibaraki